Tova Friedman (née Grossman; born January 27, 1938) is a Polish American therapist, social worker, author, and academic. She is a Holocaust survivor who was sent to the Auschwitz concentration camp. Friedman taught at the Hebrew University of Jerusalem and later served as the director of the Jewish Family Service of Somerset and Warren Counties.

Early life
Friedman was born on January 27, 1938, in Gdynia, Poland, close to Danzig. Friedman's family had moved from Tomaszow Mazowiecki, Poland, and returned there as soon as WWII broke out. Five thousand Jews were forced to live in a ghetto formed of six four-story buildings in terrible conditions. The population of the ghetto decreased over time due to starvation, shootings, and deportation. Her family was later transferred to Starachowice where her parents worked in an ammunition factory. When children began being deported from the area, Friedman's father made her hide in a crawlspace above their home's ceiling. Despite this, by the time she was five, her father had been deported to the Dachau concentration camp and she and her mother to the Auschwitz Birkenau extermination camp.

Having arrived on a Sunday in June 1944, Friedman was not killed on arrival, but was shaved and tattooed with a number. She was kept contained in the Kinderlager or "children's camp" and would go on to survive starvation and a trip to the gas extermination chamber on October 7, the one day that the chamber's mechanisms malfunctioned due to other prisoners earlier having detonated an explosive in the chamber. She was further spared from another of the crematoria because her tattooed number was not on the lists of the Nazi officers running the chamber. When the Nazis left the camp in January 1945 and were going to force the remaining survivors to go on a death march, she and her mother hid between the corpses in the infirmary and were freed by the Red Army on January 27, 1945. Soviet soldiers took a picture of her showing her tattoo, which would later become an iconic photo of the war. She and her mother returned to Poland, where they found that their home had been destroyed and most of the rest of their extended family had been killed. Her father eventually returned from Dachau and they remained together in Poland for several years.

Education and career
Friedman and her family decided to emigrate to the US in 1950. She received a Bachelors of Arts degree in psychology from Brooklyn College, a Masters of Arts in Black literature from the City College of New York, and a Masters of Arts in social work from Rutgers University. She went on to teach at the Hebrew University of Jerusalem and became Director of Jewish Family Service of Somerset and Warren Counties where she spent more than 20 years working as a therapist. During this time period, she married and had four children.

The story of Friedman's life was written about in the 1998 book Kinderlager and her grandchild opened a profile for her on TikTok where she posts videos on her experience in Auschwitz and replies to questions from children. In 2022, she published the memoir The Daughter of Auschwitz: My Story of Resilience, Survival and Hope which she wrote with journalist Malcolm Brabant.

Awards and honors
Friedman was honored by the Jewish women's organization L'Dor V'Dor on April 11, 2016.

Bibliography

References

Further reading
 
 

1938 births
20th-century American Jews
20th-century Polish Jews
21st-century American Jews
21st-century Polish Jews
American social workers
American TikTokers
Auschwitz concentration camp survivors
Brooklyn College alumni
City College of New York alumni
Academic staff of the Hebrew University of Jerusalem
Jewish concentration camp survivors
Living people
Polish emigrants to the United States
Rutgers University alumni